Rhynchospora capitellata is a species of sedge known by the common names brownish beaksedge and brownish beaked-rush. It is native to eastern North America and a few spots in the western United States. It grows in wet habitat, such as swamps, springtime meadows, and moist areas in forests. It is a perennial herb producing clumps of stems 20 to 100 centimeters tall, each stem sheathed with several narrow, pointed leaves. The inflorescence is a cluster of brown spikelets each about 3 or 4 millimeters long.

References

External links
Jepson Manual Treatment
USDA Plants Profile
Flora of North America
Photo gallery

capitellata
Flora of New Jersey
Plants described in 1803
Flora without expected TNC conservation status